Pavle Šovljanski (3 November 1927 – 21 July 1995) was a Serbian boxer. He competed in the men's light welterweight event at the 1952 Summer Olympics.

References

1927 births
1995 deaths
Serbian male boxers
Yugoslav male boxers
Olympic boxers of Yugoslavia
Boxers at the 1952 Summer Olympics
People from North Bačka District
Light-welterweight boxers